Manuel Domingos Augusto (born 2 September 1957), is an Angolan journalist, politician and diplomat, former Minister of External Relations of Angola.

References

1957 births
Living people
MPLA politicians
People from Luanda
Ambassadors of Angola to Ethiopia
Ambassadors of Angola to South Africa
Ambassadors of Angola to Zambia
Foreign ministers of Angola